Tommy Bell (born 11 November 1992) is an English rugby union player who plays for Benetton.

He began his career with Sale Sharks in the Aviva Premiership, but moved to London Wasps for the 2012/2013 season, playing alongside his brother Chris Bell.

On 6 June 2014, Bell made his move to the RFU Championship as he signed a contract with Jersey. However, after a month with Jersey, Bell was granted early release from his contract since a top flight club made an approach to him where he would officially move to Leicester Tigers.

On 17 February 2016, Bell agreed to a long-term deal with London Irish from the 2016–17 season.

He joined RFU Championship side Ealing Trailfinders for the 2019–20 season.
In 2022 he played for Benetton in United Rugby Championship.

After playing for England U18, from 2011 to 2012 Bell was named in the England U20 squad.

References

1992 births
Living people
English rugby union players
Sale Sharks players
Rugby union players from Plymouth, Devon
Leicester Tigers players
Rugby union wings
Leeds Tykes players
Wasps RFC players
Jersey Reds players
London Irish players
Ealing Trailfinders Rugby Club players
Stade Montois players
Benetton Rugby players